The New Jersey Shore Line Railroad  was part of the New York Central Railroad and ran along the Hudson River in New Jersey, from the West Shore Railroad (NYCRR) yards at Guttenberg north to the Erie Terminals Railroad at the Hudson/Bergen County line.

The entire capital stock was owned by the New Jersey Junction Railroad Company, which was under lease by the New York Central and Hudson River Railroad. In 1910,  of track were built from the West Shore Railroad Weehawken yards midway through Guttenberg north to the line with Bergen County. It opened for traffic on March 14, 1911, with the first cars passing over it on May 16, 1911. The rest of the route was never built.

The company was absorbed into the New Jersey Junction Railroad, which had owned its stock, on October 24, 1914. Eventually the line passed under control of CSX and Norfolk Southern; it was part of their River Line before it was abandoned.

See also
 Timeline of Jersey City area railroads

Defunct New Jersey railroads
Predecessors of the New York Central Railroad
Railway companies established in 1886
Railway companies disestablished in 1914